Thomas Dyja is an American writer, living in New York City. He has written three novels, a biography of civil rights activist Walter Francis White and historical books on Chicago and New York City. Play For A Kingdom received the Casey Award and The Third Coast won the Chicago Tribune Heartland Prize for Nonfiction.

Early life and education
Dyja grew up in Belmont Cragin, Chicago and attended Gordon Technical High School. He moved to New York City to attend Columbia University, graduating in 1984.

Writing

Dyja's novel The Moon In Our Hands is based on the life of Walter Francis White.

His history of New York City, New York, New York, New York: Four Decades of Success, Excess, and Transformation, covers the terms of five New York City mayors: Ed Koch (1978–1989), David Dinkins (1990–1993), Rudy Giuliani (1994–2001), Michael Bloomberg (2002–2013) and Bill de Blasio (2013–present).

Publications

Novels by Dyja
Play For A Kingdom: a Novel. Mariner, 1998. .
Meet John Trow. Viking, 2002. .
The Moon In Our Hands: a Novel. Da Capo, 2005. .

Non-fiction books by Dyja
Walter White: The Dilemma Of Black Identity In America. Ivan R. Dee, 2008. .
The Third Coast: When Chicago Built The American Dream. Penguin, 2013. .
New York, New York, New York: Four Decades of Success, Excess, and Transformation. Simon & Schuster, 2021. .

Books with contributions by Dyja
Only Connect: the Way to Save Our Schools. by Rudy Crew. Sarah Crichton, 2007. .
Up Is Down: Mid-Century Experiments in Advertising and Film at the Goldsholl Studio. Mary and Leigh Block Museum of Art, 2018. .

Books edited by Dyja
Heart: Stories of Learning to Love Again. Illumina. Marlowe, 2001. .
Life-Changing Stories of Coming of Age. Illumina. Marlowe, 2001. .
Awake: Stories of Life-Changing Epiphanies. Illumina. Marlowe, 2001. .
Life-Changing Stories of Forgiving and Being Forgiven. Illumina. Marlowe, 2001. .

Booked edited with others
The Hard Way: Writing by the Rebels Who Changed Sports. Da Capo, 1999. . With a foreword by Jim Bouton.

Awards
1997: Casey Award for Play For A Kingdom
2013: Chicago Tribune Heartland Prize for Nonfiction for The Third Coast

References

External links

Writers from Chicago
Living people
Year of birth missing (living people)

Columbia College (New York) alumni
Historians from Illinois
American biographers
American non-fiction writers